Diatomocera decurrens is a species of snout moth in the genus Diatomocera. It was described by Harrison Gray Dyar Jr., in 1914, and is known from Panama.

References

Moths described in 1914
Phycitinae